Vërmica (or Vërmicë, Serbian: Врбница/Vrbnica) is a village in the Prizren municipality of Kosovo. The village lies on the border with Albania.

History 
After Serbia acquired Kosovo in the Balkan Wars, the region was placed under martial law. The Vrbnica municipality was established during this period. It included the villages of Škoza and Dobrušta. The municipality was part of the Šar srez and the Prizren district. This administrative subdivision lasted until 6 January 1929, after which the area was made part of the Vardar Banovina.

Geography 
Vërmica is located in southwestern Kosovo and borders Albania. The village lies at the White Drin between the Koritnik in the south and the Pashtrik in the north. The R7 and the M-25 passes through the Village. Neighbouring villages are Shkoza in the northeast and Morina in Albania southwest.

Climate

Population 

Vërmica has a Population of 661. Of these, 658 are Albanians and three preferred not to answer.

Religion 
Of these 658 are Muslims. Three people preferred not to answer.

Notes

References

External links
 Location

Villages in Prizren